This is a list of recipients of the Pour le Mérite for Sciences and Arts, a German and formerly Prussian honor given since 1842 for achievement in the humanities, sciences, or arts.

Bibliography

External links
Pour le Mérite für Wissenschaften und Künste website (in German)

 
Science and technology award winners
Pour le Mérite for Sciences and Arts
Lists of German award winners